Margrave Rudolf I of Hachberg-Sausenberg (d.1313) was the son of Margrave Henry II of Hachberg and Anne of Üsenberg.  He married in 1298 or 1299 to Agnes, the heiress of Otto of Rötteln.  In 1306 he founded the side-line Hachberg-Sausenberg at Sausenburg Castle, a castle which the Margraves of Hachberg had built in 1240 on top of Mount Sausenberg.  His elder brother Henry III continued the main Baden-Hachberg line at Hochburg castle in Emmendingen.

In 1311 Lord Lüthold II of Rötteln made Rudolf his co-ruler at Rötteln Castle.  This established the foundation for the rise of the Hachberg-Sausenberg line.  Rudolf himself died before Lüthold.  In 1315, Lüthold donated the Lordship of Rötteln to Rudolf's son Henry, who came of age in that year.

He had three children: Henry, Rudolf II and Otto I.

See also 
 Margraviate of Baden
 List of rulers of Baden

References 
 Fritz Schülin: Rötteln-Haagen, Beiträge zur Orts-, Landschafts- und Siedlungsgeschichte, Lörrach, 1965, p. 65.
 Karl Seith: Die Burg Rötteln im Wandel ihrer Herrengeschlechter, Ein Beitrag zur Geschichte und Baugeschichte der Burg, self-published by the Röttelbund e.V., Haagen, cited by Schülin as: "in: Markgräferland, vol. 3, issue 1, 1931", p. 6

Footnotes

Margraves of Baden-Hachberg
13th-century births
1313 deaths
13th-century German nobility
14th-century German nobility